The men's 3000 metres steeplechase event at the 1948 Summer Olympic Games took place on 3 and 5 August.  The final was won by Swede Tore Sjöstrand.  Sjöstrand's compatriots, Erik Elmsäter and Göte Hagström took 2nd and 3rd place.

Records
Prior to the competition, the existing Olympic records was as follows.

Schedule
All times are British Summer Time (UTC+1).

Results

Round 1
Round 1 was held on 3 August. The first four runners from each heat advanced to the final.

Heat 1

Heat 2

Heat 3

Final

Key: DNF = Did not finish

References

External links
Organising Committee for the XIV Olympiad, The (1948). The Official Report of the Organising Committee for the XIV Olympiad. LA84 Foundation. Retrieved 4 September 2016.

Athletics at the 1948 Summer Olympics
Steeplechase at the Olympics
Men's events at the 1948 Summer Olympics